New Studies in Medieval History was a series of undergraduate level books on medieval history published by Macmillan between 1973 and the mid-1990s.

French and Italian history notably featured in the list of volumes with Chris Wickham's Early Mediaeval Italy (1981), Edward James's The Origins of France (1982), and Roger Collins's Early Medieval Spain (1983) forming a trilogy that was described by Paul Fouracre in Teaching History in 1986 as being "required reading for undergraduates studying the early middle ages". Margaret Gibson, in The English Historical Review in 1988, described the series as having a "reputation for thorough, reliable scholarship".

Selected titles
 Society and Politics in Mediaeval Italy. J.K. Hyde, 1973.  
Spain in the Middle Ages: From Frontier to Empire, 1000-1500. Angus MacKay, 1977. 
The Northern Crusades, the Baltic and the Catholic Frontier, 1100-1525. Eric Christiansen, 1980. 
Early Mediaeval Italy: Central Power and Local Society, 400-1000. Chris Wickham, 1981. 
 The Origins of France: From Clovis to the Capetians 500-1000. Edward James, 1982. 
Early Medieval Spain: Unity in Diversity, 400-1000. Roger Collins, 1983. 
Hermits and the New Monasticism: A Study of Religious Communities in Western Europe 1000-1150. Henrietta Leyser, 1984. 
Medieval Thought: The Western Intellectual Tradition from Antiquity to the Thirteenth Century. Michael Haren, 1985. 
Literature and Society in Medieval France: The Mirror and the Image 1100-1500. Lynette R. Muir, 1986. 
The Military Orders from the Twelfth to the Early Fourteenth Centuries. Alan Forey, 1991. 
A History of France, 1460 - 1560: The Emergence of a Nation State. David Potter, 1995. 
The Making of Orthodox Byzantium, 600-1025. Mark Whittow, 1996.

References

External links 
https://www.librarything.com/nseries/43172/New-Studies-in-Medieval-History

Series of history books
Macmillan Publishers books
Historiography of the Middle Ages
History of Europe